István Haller (18 November 1880 – 5 March 1964) was a Hungarian politician, who served as Minister of Religion and Education between 1919 and 1920.

Biography
He prepared the law of Numerus clausus and submitted for the Diet of Hungary. The Hungarian Numerus Clausus was introduced in 1920. The policy is often seen as the first anti-Jewish Act of 20th-century Europe. Though the text did not use the term "Jew", it was nearly the only group overrepresented in higher education. Its aim was to restrict the number of Jews to 6%, which was their proportion in Hungary at that time; the rate of Jewish students was 25–40% in the 1910s in different faculties. Haller became chairman of the KNEP in 1920, but soon lost his mandate.

References
 Magyar Életrajzi Lexikon

1880 births
1964 deaths
Hungarian people of Austrian descent
Hungarian people of German descent
Education ministers of Hungary